Galaxy 1 was the first in a line of Galaxy communications satellites launched by Hughes Communications in 1983.

It helped fill a hole in satellite broadcasting bandwidth created by the loss of RCA's Satcom 3 in 1979. Unlike satellite owners RCA and Western Union, Hughes did not lease time on their transponders in the fashion of a common carrier, but instead sold transponders outright to content providers. This created a stable lineup of content attractive enough for cable providers to dedicate Earth station receivers to it full-time.

Among the services on Galaxy 1 by mid-1984: HBO, Cinemax, The Movie Channel, Showtime, The Disney Channel, TBS, CNN, ESPN, and The Nashville Network.

Retirement of Galaxy 1 
Galaxy 1 was originally slated for retirement in 1992 and replacement by Galaxy 1R, but the replacement was lost during launch on 22 August 1992, due to a failure of the booster rocket's second stage Centaur engine. Galaxy 1 was eventually replaced in 1994 by Galaxy 1RR.

Home Box Office 
The HBO (Home Box Office) signal on transponder 23 of Galaxy 1 was interrupted during the infamous Captain Midnight attack on 27 April 1986. The attack was directed at HBO for their adoption of the Videocipher system and for charging high prices for access to the HBO and Cinemax services with that system.

See also 

 List of Intelsat satellites

References 

Communications satellites
Spacecraft launched in 1983
Satellites using the HS-376 bus